Various obsolete weapon systems owned and operated by the South African Air Force.

References

South African Air Force
Weapons of South Africa